Joseph Cook (24 September 1880 – 17 January 1964) was a British gymnast. He competed in the men's artistic individual all-around event at the 1908 Summer Olympics.

References

1880 births
1964 deaths
British male artistic gymnasts
Olympic gymnasts of Great Britain
Gymnasts at the 1908 Summer Olympics
Sportspeople from London
20th-century British people